The Church of Jesus Christ of Latter-day Saints in Costa Rica refers to the Church of Jesus Christ of Latter-day Saints (LDS Church) and its members in Costa Rica. The first branch (small congregation) was organized in 1950. As of December 31, 2021, there were 52,047 members in 78 congregations in Costa Rica.

History

On July 8, 1946, Costa Rica became part of the LDS Church's Mexican Mission. The first two missionaries, Robert B. Miller and David D. Lingard, arrived in Costa Rica on September 6, 1946. They presented Costa Rican president Teodoro Picado Michalski a copy of the Book of Mormon and began preaching in the country. Due to political unrest, the missionaries left the country in 1948 and 1949.  Missionaries returned in 1950 and had their first public meeting on June 7, 1950, with 70 people in attendance.  The first branch was organized on August 25, 1950 and the property for the meetinghouse was purchased in 1951.

Stakes and District
As of February 2023, Costa Rica had the following stakes:

Missions
The Mexico Mission was the first to send missionaries to Costa Rica. On November 16, 1952 the Central American Mission was organized. It was renamed the Central America Mission on June 10, 1970 and then the Costa Rica San Jose mission on June 20, 1974 as more missions were created in Central America. On July 1, 2015, the Costa Rica San Jose West Mission was created with the Costa Rica San Jose Mission being renamed the Costa Rica San Jose East Mission.

Temples
The San José Costa Rica Temple was dedicated on June 4, 2000 by James E. Faust.

See also

Religion in Costa Rica

References

External links
 History of the Church in Costa Rica David R. Crockett
 Antonio Pineda, Convert and Bishop David Grant
 "His Ways" - missionary experience Brandon Martin
 Jose Maria Figueres, President of Costa Rica Stan Pugsley
 The Church of Jesus Christ of Latter-day Saints (Costa Rica) - Official Site
 ComeUntoChrist.org Latter-day Saints Visitor site

 
Church of Jesus Christ of Latter-day Saints